h

Indian Institute of Engineering Science and Technology, Shibpur (IIEST Shibpur), erstwhile Bengal Engineering College (also known as B.E. College), formerly Bengal Engineering and Science University (also known as BESU), is a public research university also a National Institute of Technology located at Shibpur, Howrah, West Bengal. Founded in 1856, it is one of the oldest public research university. It is recognised as an Institute of National Importance under MHRD by the Government of India. It is controlled by the Council of NITSER.

History 

The college was founded as the Civil Engineering College on November 24, 1856, in Writers' Building, Calcutta (now Kolkata). The college was established as an independent entity in 1880 as Government College, Howrah, in the premises of Bishop's College in Shibpur, Howrah. In 1921, the name of the college was changed to Bengal Engineering College. B.E. College was previously affiliated to the University of Calcutta. At that time it contained only civil and mechanical engineering departments. Several other departments were created subsequently over the years, the last among them being that of Aerospace Engineering and Applied Mechanics in 2010.

On 1 October 2004, the institution was conferred the status of a full-fledged university. It was formally inaugurated as Bengal Engineering and Science University by A. P. J. Abdul Kalam, the President of India, on 13 July 2005.

In March 2014, the institute was conferred the status of an INI and was renamed Indian Institute of Engineering Science and Technology, Shibpur by the Govt. of India by suitably amending the National Institutes of Technology and Science Education and Research Act, 2007. The conversion process of BESU to IIEST was mentored by IIT Kanpur. President of India, Pranab Mukherjee inaugurated it as IIEST on 24 August 2014.

In June 2014, Govt. of West Bengal appointed IIEST Shibpur as the Mentor Institute for Indian Institute of Information Technology, Kalyani, which was inaugurated in June the same year.

Organisation and administration

Departments 
IIEST Shibpur has 16 departments, 2 multi-disciplinary centers and 8 schools of excellence. The academic departments (in order of their year of establishment) are:

 Civil Engineering
 Mathematics
 Chemistry
 Mining Engineering
 Electrical Engineering
 Earth Sciences
 Mechanical Engineering
 Physics
 Metallurgy and Materials Engineering
 Humanities and Social Sciences
 Architecture, Town and Regional Planning
 Electronics & Telecommunication Engineering
 Computer Science and Technology
 Human Resource Management
 Information Technology
 Aerospace Engineering and Applied Mechanics

Schools and centres
Following are the multi-disciplinary centers located in IIEST Shibpur:
 Center of Healthcare Science and Technology

Eight schools of excellence in IIEST are:

 School of Advanced Materials, Green Energy and Sensor Systems 
 Purabi Das School of Information Technology
 School of Community Science and Technology
 School of Disaster Mitigation Engineering
 School of Ecology, Infrastructure and Human Settlement Management
 School of Management Sciences
 School of Mechatronics and Robotics
 School of VLSI Technology

Academics

Library
The institute's Ramanujan Central Library occupies  and houses 158,000 books, 41,000 bound volumes of journals, and a collection of documents, such as patents, standards, technical reports and pamphlets. The library has old and rare books and journals of the nineteenth century.

Admission procedure 
Undergraduate programs to the various engineering disciplines (4-year B. Tech. programs) and architecture (5-year B.Arch. program) are granted via JEE Main, taking 50% students from the home state (West Bengal) and 50% from other states. Students from any discipline other than Architecture, on the basis of their performance, are allowed to change their disciplines at the end of the 1st Year (i.e., second semester) and may opt for dual degree (B.Tech.-M.Tech.) courses extending over 10 semesters as per terms and conditions specified by the institute. For PG programs admission is through GATE for M.Tech. courses and Joint Entrance Screening Test for MSc. Students are also admitted in Ph.D programs twice a year through online applications.

Ranking 

IIEST Shibpur has ranked 301-350 among the top 650 Universities in Asia category by the QS Asia Ranking 2021,

In India, IIEST Shibpur was ranked 43rd overall and 21st among engineering institutes by the NIRF rankings in 2020.

Noted people

Notable faculty 
 John Samuel Slater, principal
 Sankar Sen, professor of electrical engineering department.
 Joseph Allen Stein, professor and head of the Department of Architecture

Notable alumni 

Soumitro Banerjee, electrical engineer, Shanti Swarup Bhatnagar laureate
Amitabha Bhattacharyya, production engineer, Shanti Swarup Bhatnagar laureate
Gautam Biswas, director, IIT Guwahati
Promode R. Bandyopadhyay, American-Indian Inventor
Bimal Kumar Bose, scholar in Power Electronics, Chondra Chair of Excellence in Power Electronics, Professor Emeritus at University of Tennessee, member of National Academy of Engineering
Soumyen Bandyopadhyay, Architect at Liverpool University holds Sir James Stirling chair in architecture
Pradip Chatterjee, flautist and singer, founding member of Mohiner Ghoraguli
Arunendu Das, songwriter
Chaitanyamoy Ganguly, nuclear scientist, Padma Shri recipient
Amitabha Ghosh ex-director, IIT Kharagpur
Buddhadev Das Gupta, classical sarod player, Padma Bhusan recipient
Fazlur Rahman Khan, structural engineer and architect. Called the "Einstein of structural engineering"
Binoy Majumdar, poet, Sahitya Akademi Award winner
Rajen Mookerjee, industrialist, co-founder of Martin Burn & Co. and founder of Indian Iron & Steel Co. Ltd.
M. A. Rashid, first Vice-chancellor of Bangladesh University of Engineering and Technology
Nandini Mukherjee, HOD of Computer Science & Information Technology Department, Jadavpur University and noted CPI(M) politician.
Shankar Nath Rimal, Nepalese civil engineer, designer of modern Nepalese flag
Tathagata Roy, Ex GM / Chief Engineer Metro Railway and politician, Governor of Tripura
Narayan Sanyal, novelist, writer of "Shatyakam".
Badal Sarkar, dramatist and theatre director, Padma Shri recipient
Jatindranath Sengupta, poet and writer.

References

External links

Engineering colleges in West Bengal
Universities and colleges in Howrah district
Education in Howrah
All India Council for Technical Education
Academic institutions associated with the Bengal Renaissance
Educational institutions established in 1856
1856 establishments in British India